The men's doubles tournament of the 2022 BWF World Championships took place from 22 to 28 August 2022 at the Tokyo Metropolitan Gymnasium in Tokyo.

Seeds

The seeding list was based on the World Rankings of 9 August 2022.

  Marcus Fernaldi Gideon / Kevin Sanjaya Sukamuljo (third round)
  Takuro Hoki / Yugo Kobayashi (quarter-finals)
  Mohammad Ahsan / Hendra Setiawan (final)
  Lee Yang / Wang Chi-lin (third round)
  Fajar Alfian / Muhammad Rian Ardianto (semi-finals)
  Aaron Chia / Soh Wooi Yik (champions)
  Satwiksairaj Rankireddy / Chirag Shetty (semi-finals)
  Kim Astrup / Anders Skaarup Rasmussen (second round)

  Ong Yew Sin / Teo Ee Yi (second round)
  Choi Sol-gyu / Seo Seung-jae (quarter-finals)
  Goh Sze Fei / Nur Izzudin (third round)
  Mark Lamsfuß / Marvin Seidel (third round)
  Goh V Shem / Tan Wee Kiong (second round)
  Ben Lane / Sean Vendy (quarter-finals)
  Muhammad Shohibul Fikri / Bagas Maulana (second round)
  Akira Koga / Taichi Saito (third round)

Draw

Finals

Top half

Section 1

Section 2

Bottom half

Section 3

Section 4

References

2022 BWF World Championships